Salina is an unincorporated populated place in Jefferson County, Iowa. Prominent early-twentieth-century Nebraska political figure George C. Junkin was born in Salina in 1858.

References

Populated places in Iowa